Rocky Mountain University of Health Professions (RMUoHP) is a private, for-profit university focused on graduate healthcare education and located in Provo, Utah.  It was established in 1998 and is accredited by the Northwest Commission of Colleges and Universities. RMUoHP's student body represents all 50 states and offers both residential and limited-residency programs.

History
Rocky Mountain University of Physical Therapy was established in 1998 by Dr. Richard P. Nielsen and Dr. Michael Skurja Jr. as an exclusive post-professional graduate healthcare institution. Nielsen and Skurja, both board-certified electrophysiologists, had co-founded the Institute for Clinical Electrophysiology in 1993, and had been involved in developing continuing education courses for several years. They dreamed of combining all of the curricula they had developed into a Doctor of Electrophysiology program, but the Institute wasn't authorized to award degrees, only certificates. Nielsen and Skurja began the process of obtaining authorization from the Utah State Board of Regents, and on June 8, 1998, The Institute for Clinical Electrophysiology officially became Rocky Mountain University of Physical Therapy and began offering a Doctor of Physical Therapy (DPT) program with seven specialty concentrations, including cardiopulmonology, electrophysiology, geriatrics, neurology, orthopedics, sports, and pediatrics.

The following year, in 1999, instruction officially began with ten faculty, six employees, and eight students in the first class. Ninety students enrolled in the first year. In December 2000, Rocky Mountain University of Physical Therapy was registered as a developing institution with the Northwest Commission of Colleges and Universities for regional accreditation. That same year, RMUoHP began offering its Master of Science in Physical Therapy program and the university's name was changed to Rocky Mountain University of Health Professions (RMUoHP).

By 2003 RMUoHP had added the first post-professional Doctor of Occupational Therapy (OTD) program in the country. The university gained regional accreditation candidacy status in November 2005 and added a Doctor of Nursing Practice (DNP) program the following year. RMUoHP also expanded its OTD program to include specialty tracks, and began offering a Doctor of Science in Health Sciences program in 2007.

In May 2010 RMUoHP began offering a residency entry-level Doctor of Physical Therapy program, and became the first proprietary graduate institution in the NW region to gain accreditation by the Northwest Commission of Colleges and Universities .

In 2014 RMUoHP began offering the first limited-residency model Doctor of Clinical Science in Speech-Language Pathology program. By the next year RMUoHP had also added its entry-level Master of Physician Assistant Studies, and in 2016 its entry-level Post-Bachelor's Doctor of Nursing Practice (FNP) program, as well as a Master of Science in Speech-Language Pathology program with a medical emphasis in 2017. RMUoHP is one of the pioneer institutions for Speech-Language Pathology with a medical emphasis.

RMUoHP now awards 10 master's and doctoral degrees and four graduate certificates and fellowships.  RMUoHP has 2,021 alumni. In 2018, Wasatch Educational Group, the parent company of Rocky Mountain University of Health Professions, announced plans to break ground on a medical school, which will open in 2021.

Campus 
Rocky Mountain University of Health Professions is located in Provo, Utah, in the East Bay Technology Park. RMUoHP's campus is 85,000 square feet, and sits at an elevation of 4,551 feet (1387 m).

The land, along with an additional  of property, will be the location for a new medical school campus. The school is to be named the Noorda College of Osteopathic Medicine.

Housing 
All student housing is off-campus and generally includes apartments and houses for residential students and hotels for non-residential students. RMUoHP does not own, operate, or maintain housing facilities for students.

Academics
RMUoHP awards 10 graduate and doctoral degrees and 4 certificates and fellowships, including:

Master’s programs 

 Master of Science in Health Science (MSHS)
 Master of Physician Assistant Studies (MPAS)
 Master of Science in Medical Speech-Language Pathology (MS MedSLP)

Doctoral programs 
 Doctor of Medical Sciences (DMSc) for physician assistants
 Doctor of Science in Health Science (DSc)
 Post-Master's Doctor of Nursing Practice (DNP)
 Post-Bachelor's Doctor of Nursing Practice Family Nurse Practitioner (DNP/FNP)
 Doctor of Physical Therapy (DPT)
 Post-Professional Doctor of Occupational Therapy (OTD)
 Doctor of Clinical Science in Speech-Language Pathology (ClinScD SLP)
 Transitional Doctor of Physical Therapy in Pediatric Science (tDPT)

Certificate programs 

 Post-Master's Family Nurse Practitioner Certificate (FNP Cert)
 Post-Master's Psychiatric Mental Health Nurse Practitioner Certificate Program (PMHNP)
 Learning Design in Healthcare Education Graduate Certificate (LDHE)
 Seattle Children's Neonatology Fellowship

RMUoHP's 2018 total enrollment was 775. Approximately 61 percent of the student body comes from the Western United States, with the remaining 39 percent coming from the remaining states or out of the country. Since its inception, RMUoHP has awarded 2058 degrees and certificates, and has 2021 alumni.

Research 
The RMUoHP Foundation provides funding and support for student and faculty research in the field of health science. In 2018, RMUoHP launched and funded $19,960 worth of internal grants to faculty engaged in a wide range of research. Since the university's inception, there have been over 800 peer-reviewed student and faculty articles in 260 publications.

Current faculty and student research efforts include projects related to clinical development, education, and clinical interventions. RMUoHP faculty are engaged in research designed to enhance cultural competency and examining the prevalence of evidence-based practice among recent alumni from RMUoHP. Other faculty are seeking to enhance clinical placement by examining the motivations of clinical educations. The university is engaged in interprofessional education whereby students from different disciplines collaborate to treat cases, and faculty are evaluating the effectiveness of this novel intervention.

Office of Research and Sponsored Projects 
In August 2017, RMUoHP established the Office of Research and Sponsored Projects (ORSP). ORSP's purpose is to remove barriers for faculty and students to conduct innovative research that will enhance knowledge and provide evidence for better clinical practice.

References

External links
Official website

Private universities and colleges in Utah
Educational institutions established in 1998
Universities and colleges in Utah County, Utah
Universities and colleges accredited by the Northwest Commission on Colleges and Universities
Provo, Utah
1998 establishments in Utah
For-profit universities and colleges in the United States